Sphenomorphus crassus  is a species of skink found in Malaysia.

References

crassus
Reptiles described in 2001
Taxa named by Robert F. Inger
Taxa named by Fui Lian Tan
Taxa named by Maklarin Lakim
Taxa named by Paul Yambun
Reptiles of Borneo